The Fiat Toro is a pickup truck made by Fiat in Brazil. It is derived from the Fiat FCC4 Concept and is based on the Small Wide 4×4 architecture shared with the Jeep Renegade, Jeep Compass, and the Fiat 500X. In several markets in Latin America including Colombia, the Toro is sold as the Ram 1000, using the Ram Trucks marque.

History

The Fiat Toro was developed under the codename Type 226, intended as the second product of the FCA factory in Goiana, Pernambuco, Brazil. It became the country's first medium-compact pickup since the Renault Duster Oroch.

In May 2016, the Toro won a Red Dot Design Award.

In the Brazilian market, Fiat sold over 100,000 units in the first two years following the Toro's launch.

Safety
The Toro has front disc brakes.

The Toro in its most basic Latin American configuration with 2 airbags received 4 stars for adult occupants and 4 stars for infants from Latin NCAP in 2018. The Toro had a total score enough for five stars for adult protection, however it did not meet the prerequisite that a side head protection device be fitted as standard across the range and pass a side pole impact test. Fiat sponsored a side pole test on a variant with the optional head airbags fitted and Latin NCAP confirmed that it passed the side pole test, indicating that the model would have achieved five stars, had the head airbags been standard equipment.

Sales

Facelift 
The Toro facelift was released in April 2021. It is equipped with a new turbocharged 1.3-liter engine running with petrol/ethanol. available in Brazil in Endurance, Freedom, Volcano, Ranch, and Ultra trim levels.

Notes

References

External links

 Official website (Brazil)

Toro
Pickup trucks
Sport utility trucks
Latin NCAP pick-ups
Cars of Brazil

Cars introduced in 2016